Joaquín Robles López (born June 8, 1964) is a Spanish politician for the Vox party.

Lopez studied a degree in philosophy at the University of Murcia and then worked as a teacher and professor at the Universidad San Juan de la Cruz. In the Spanish general election of April 2019 he was elected to the Congress of Deputies for the Murcia constituency, and again during the November 2019 election.

References 

1964 births
Living people
Members of the 13th Congress of Deputies (Spain)
Members of the 14th Congress of Deputies (Spain)
Vox (political party) politicians